Neurothemis decora is a species of dragonfly in the family Libellulidae.

Distribution
This species is present in New Guinea.

References

External links
 Asia-dragonfly

Libellulidae
Insects described in 1866